Katarzyna Kawa and Magdalena Fręch were the defending champions but Fręch chose not to participate. Kawa partnered alongside Tereza Mihalíková, but they lost in the first round to Emily Appleton and Fernanda Contreras.

Quinn Gleason and Catherine Harrison won the title, defeating Alycia Parks and Alana Smith in the final, 6–2, 6–2.

Seeds

Draw

Draw

References
Main Draw

Mercer Tennis Classic - Doubles